— From "The Charge of the Light Brigade" by Alfred Lord Tennyson, first published this year

Nationality words link to articles with information on the nation's poetry or literature (for instance, Irish or France).

Works published in English

United Kingdom

 William Allingham, Day and Night Songs
 W. E. Aytoun, writing under the pen name "T. Percy Jones", Firmilian; or, The Student of Badajoz, subtitle: "A Spasmodic tragedy"
 Thomas De Quincey, Selections Grave and Gay, including biographical essays (originally published in Tait's Edinburgh Magazine in 1834, 1835, 1839 and 1840) on some of the Lake Poets (see also Recollections of the Lakes and the Lake Poets 1860, in which all of the Recollections essays were published)
 Eliza Craven Green, "Ellan Vannin" (later set to music)
 John Keats, The Poetical Works of John Keats, edited by Richard Monckton Milnes; posthumously published
 Coventry Patmore, "The Angel in the House", Part I, also known as The Betrothal (see also The Espousals 1856, Faithful for Ever 1860, The Victories of Love 1863)
 Alfred Lord Tennyson, "The Charge of the Light Brigade" published in The Examiner on December 9

United States
 Benjamin Paul Blood, The Bride of the Iconoclast
 William Cullen Bryant, Poems
 Phoebe Cary, Poems and Parodies
 William J. Grayson, The Hireling and the Slave
 William Howe Cuyler Hosmer, Poetical Works
 Julia Ward Howe, Passion Flowers
 Frances Harper, Poems on Miscellaneous Subjects

Works published in other languages

France
 Louise Colet:
 Ce qu'on rêve en aimant
 L'Acropole d'Athènes
 Gérard de Nerval, The Chimeras, poems appended to the author's book of short stories, Les Filles du feu
 Tiouttchev, Poésies

Other
 Heinrich Heine, Gedichte. 1853 und 1854 ("Poems. 1853 and 1854"), German poet and author living in France

Births
Death years link to the corresponding "[year] in poetry" article:
 January 9 – Govind Vasudev Kanitkar (died 1918), Indian, Marathi-language poet and translator
 April 13 – William Henry Drummond (died 1907), Canadian
 September 24 – George Frederick Cameron (died 1885), Canadian
 October 16 – Oscar Wilde (died 1900), Irish-born playwright and poet
 October 20
 Alphonse Allais (died 1905), French humorist
 Arthur Rimbaud (died 1891), French

Deaths
Birth years link to the corresponding "[year] in poetry" article:
 January 12 — Eliza Townsend (born 1788), American
 March 29 – Charlotte Caroline Richardson (born 1796), English
 April 3 – John Wilson (born 1785), Scots
 April 16 – Julia Nyberg (born 1784), Swedish poet and songwriter
 April 24 – Gabriele Rossetti (born 1783), English
 April 30 – James Montgomery (born 1771), Scots
 December 9 – Almeida Garrett (born 1799), Portuguese

See also

 19th century in poetry
 19th century in literature
 List of years in poetry
 List of years in literature
 Victorian literature
 French literature of the 19th century
 Poetry

Notes

19th-century poetry
Poetry